The Principality of Catalonia was a medieval and early modern state in the northeastern Iberian Peninsula. During most of its history it was in dynastic union with the Kingdom of Aragon, constituting together the Crown of Aragon. Between the 13th and the 18th centuries, it was bordered by the Kingdom of Aragon to the west, the Kingdom of Valencia to the south, the Kingdom of France and the feudal lordship of Andorra to the north and by the Mediterranean Sea to the east. The term Principality of Catalonia remained in use until the Second Spanish Republic, when its use declined because of its historical relation to the monarchy. Today, the term Principat (Principality) is used primarily to refer to the autonomous community of Catalonia in Spain, as distinct from the other Catalan Countries, and usually including the historical region of Roussillon in Southern France.

The first reference to Catalonia and the Catalans appears in the Liber maiolichinus de gestis Pisanorum illustribus, a Pisan chronicle (written between 1117 and 1125) of the conquest of Majorca by a joint force of Italians, Catalans, and Occitans. At the time, Catalonia did not yet exist as a political entity, though the use of this term seems to acknowledge Catalonia as a cultural or geographical entity. The counties that eventually made up the Principality of Catalonia were gradually unified under the rule of the count of Barcelona. In 1137, the County of Barcelona and the Kingdom of Aragon were unified under a single dynasty, creating what modern historians call the Crown of Aragon; however, Aragon and Catalonia retained their own political structure and legal traditions, developing separate political communities along the next centuries. Under Alfons I the Troubador (reigned 1164–1196), Catalonia was regarded as a legal entity for the first time. Still, the term Principality of Catalonia was not used legally until the 14th century, when it was applied to the territories ruled by the Courts of Catalonia.

Its institutional system evolved over the centuries, establishing political bodies analogous to the ones of the other kingdoms of the Crown (such as the Courts, the Generalitat or the Consell de Cent) and legislation (constitutions, derived from the Usages of Barcelona) which largely limited the royal power and secured the political model of pactism. Catalonia contributed to further develop the Crown trade and military, most significantly their navy. Catalan language flourished and expanded as more territories were added to the Crown, including Valencia, the Balearic Islands, Sardinia, Sicily, Naples and Athens, constituting a thalassocracy across the Mediterranean. The crisis of the 14th century, the end of the rule of House of Barcelona (1410) and a civil war (1462–1472) weakened the role of the Principality in Crown and international affairs.

The marriage of Ferdinand II of Aragon and Isabella I of Castile in 1469 laid the foundations of the Monarchy of Spain. In 1492 the Spanish colonization of the Americas began, and political power began to shift away towards Castile. Tensions between Catalan institutions and the Monarchy, alongside the peasants' revolts, provoked the Reapers' War (1640–1659). By the Treaty of the Pyrenees the Roussillon was ceded to France. During the War of the Spanish Succession (1701–1714), the Crown of Aragon supported the Archduke Charles of Habsburg. After the surrender of Barcelona in 1714, king Philip V of Bourbon, inspired by the French model, imposed absolutism and a unifying administration across Spain, and enacted the Nueva Planta decrees for every realm of the Crown of Aragon, which suppressed the main Catalan, Aragonese, Valencian and Majorcan political institutions and rights and merged them into the Crown of Castile as provinces. However, the Principality of Catalonia remained as an administrative unit until the establishment of the Spanish provincial division of 1833, which divided Catalonia into four provinces.

History

Origins
Like much of the Mediterranean coast of the Iberian Peninsula, it was colonized by Ancient Greeks, who chose to settle in Roses. Both Greeks and Carthaginians interacted with the main Iberian population. After the Carthaginian defeat, it became, along with the rest of Hispania, a part of the Roman Empire, Tarraco being one of the main Roman posts in the Iberian Peninsula and the capital of the province of Tarraconensis.

The Visigoths ruled after the Western Roman Empire's collapse near the end of the 5th century. Moorish Al-Andalus gained control in the early 8th century, after conquering the Visigothic kingdom in 711–718. After the defeat of Emir Abdul Rahman Al Ghafiqiwas's troops at Tours in 732, the Franks gradually gained control of the former Visigoth territories north of the Pyrenees, which had been captured by the Muslims or had become allied with them, in what is today Catalonia under French administration. In 795, Charlemagne created what came to be known by historiography and some Frankish chronicles as the Marca Hispanica, a buffer zone beyond the province of Septimania, made up of locally administered separate counties which served as a defensive barrier between the Umayyad of Al-Andalus and the Frankish Kingdom.

A distinctive Catalan culture started to develop in the Middle Ages stemming from a number of these small counties throughout the northernmost part of Catalonia. The counts of Barcelona were Frankish vassals nominated by the Carolingian emperor, then the king of the Franks, to whom they were feudatories (801–988). In 878, Wilfred the Hairy, count of Urgell and Cerdanya, was appointed count of Barcelona, Girona and Osona. Since then, these last three counties were always ruled by the same person, becoming the political core of the future Principality of Catalonia. Upon his death in 897 Wilfred made their titles hereditaries and thus founded the dynasty of the House of Barcelona, which ruled Catalonia until the death of Martin I, its last ruling member, in 1410. Many abbeys were founded between the ninth century and the twelfth century while in the cities the episcopal seats were restored, forming important artistic and intellectual centers. These religious centers contribute to an important diffusion of the Romanesque art in Catalonia (monasteries of Santa Maria de Ripoll and Montserrat, collegiate church of Cardona, cathedral of Girona...) as well as to the maintenance of rich libraries nourished by Classical, Visigothic and Arab works. The scholar and mathematician Gerbert d'Aurillac (future pope under the name of Sylvester II) studied in Vic and Ripoll and knowledge of mathematics and astronomy were introduced from Arabic.

In 988 Count Borrell II did not recognise the Frankish king Hugh Capet and his new dynasty, effectively taking Barcelona out of Frankish rule. From that point on, the counts of Barcelona often referred to themselves as princeps (prince), in order to show their preeminence over the other Catalan counts. During the 9th and 10th centuries, the counties increasingly became a society of aloers, peasant proprietors of small, family-based farms, who lived by subsistence agriculture and owed no formal feudal allegiance. At the start of the 11th century the Catalan Counties suffer an important process of feudalisation, as the miles formed links of vassalage over this previously independent peasantry. The middle years of the century were characterized by virulent class warfare. Seigniorial violence was unleashed against the peasants, utilizing new military tactics, based on contracting well armed mercenary soldiers mounted on horses. By the end of the century, most of the aloers had been converted into vassals. During the regency of countess Ermesinde of Carcassonne (1017-1057), which received the government of Barcelona after the death of her husband the count Ramon Borrell, the disintegration of central power was evident.  The response of the Catholic Church to the feudal violence was the establishment of the sagreres around churches and the movement of Peace and Truce of God. The first assembly of Peace and Truce was presided by Abbot Oliba in Toulouges, Roussillon in 1027. The grandson of Ermesinde, count Ramon Berenguer I, began the codification of Catalan law in the written Usages of Barcelona which was to become the first full compilation of feudal law in Western Europe. Legal codification was part of the count's efforts to forward and somehow control the process of feudalization.

Under count Ramon Berenguer III, the County of Barcelona experienced a new phase of territorial expansion. This included a joint Catalan and Pisan Crusade against the Taifa of Majorca (1114) and the conquest of Tarragona (1116), restoring in the last one the archiepiscopal see of the city (1119), disbanded after the Muslim conquest. That meant the independence of the Catalan Church from the bishopric of Narbonne.

Dynastic union
In 1137 Count Ramon Berenguer IV of Barcelona married Queen Petronilla of Aragon, establishing the dynastic union of the County of Barcelona and its dominions with the Kingdom of Aragon, which was to create the Crown of Aragon. The reign of Ramon Berenguer IV saw the Catalan conquest of Lleida and Tortosa. Their son, Alfons, was the first king of Aragon who, in turn was the count of Barcelona, titles all the kings of the Crown of Aragon inherited from then on. During the reign of Alfons, in 1173, Catalonia was legally delimited for the first time, while the first compilation of the Usages of Barcelona was made in the process to turn them into the law of Catalonia (Consuetudinem Cathalonie). Apart from the Usages, between 1170 and 1195 the Liber feudorum maior and the Gesta Comitum Barchinonensium were compiled and written, being considered together as the three milestones of Catalan political identity.

His son, king Peter II of Aragon, faced the defense of the Occitan territories, acquired from the times of Ramon Berenguer I onwards, from the Albigensian Crusade. The Battle of Muret (12 September 1213) and the unexpected defeat of King Peter and his vassals and allies, the counts of Toulouse, Comminges and Foix, against the French-Crusader armies, resulted in the fading of the strong human, cultural and economic ties existing between the ancient territories of Catalonia and the Languedoc.

In the Treaty of Corbeil, 1258, James I of Aragon, descendant of Sunifred and Bello of Carcassonne and therefore heir of the House of Barcelona, relinquished his family rights and dominions in the Languedoc and recognized the Capetian king of France Louis IX as heir of the Carolingian Dynasty. In return, the king of France formally renounced his claims of feudal lordship over all the Catalan counties. This treaty confirmed, from French point of view, the independence of the Catalan counties established and exercised during the previous three centuries, but also meant the irremediable separation between the people of Catalonia and the Languedoc.

As a coastal territory within the Crown of Aragon and with the increasing importance of the port of Barcelona, Catalonia became the main centre of the Crown's maritime power, promoting and helping to expand its influence and power by conquest and trade into Valencia, the Balearic Islands, Sardinia and Sicily.

Catalan constitutions (1283–1716) and the 15th century

At the same time, the Principality of Catalonia developed a complex institutional and political system based on the concept of pact between the estates of the realm and the monarch. The laws (called constitutions) had to be approved in the General Court of Catalonia, one of the first parliamentary bodies of Europe that banned the royal power to create legislation unilaterally, sharing it with the estates represented in the Court (since 1283). The first Catalan constitutions, derived from the Usages of Barcelona, are of the ones from the Catalan Courts (Corts) of Barcelona from 1283. The last ones were promulgated by the Courts of 1705–1706, presided by the disputed Habsburg king Charles III. The compilations of the Constitutions and other rights of Catalonia followed the Roman tradition of the Codex. This constitutions developed a compilation of rights for the inhabitants of the Principality and limited the power of the kings.

The General Court of Catalonia (or Catalan Courts), with roots dating from the 11th century, is one of the first parliamentary bodies of Europe that, since 1283, obtained the power to create legislation with the monarch. The Courts were composed of the three Estates organized in to "arms" (braços), were presided over by the monarch as count of Barcelona. The current Parliament of Catalonia is considered the symbolic and historic successor of this institution.

In order to recapt the "tax of the General", the Courts of 1359 established a permanent representation of deputies, called Deputation of the General (in Catalan: Diputació del General) and later usually known as Generalitat, which gained considerable political power over the next centuries.

The Principality saw a prosperous period during the 13th century and the first half of the 14th. The population increased; Catalan language and culture expanded into the islands of the Western Mediterranean. The reign of Peter III of Aragon ("the Great") included the conquest of Sicily and the successful defense against a French crusade; his son and successor Alfonso III ("the Generous") conquered Menorca; and Peter's second son James II conquered Sardinia; Catalonia was the center of the empire, expanding and organizing it, establishing institutional systems similar to its own. Barcelona, then the most frequent royal residence, was consolidated as the administrative center of the domains with the establishment of the Royal Archives in 1318. The Catalan Company, mercenaries led by Roger de Flor and formed by Almogavar veterans of the War of the Sicilian Vespers, were hired by the Byzantine Empire to fight the Turks, defeating them in several battles. After the assassination of Roger de Flor by orders of the emperor's son Michael Palaiologos (1305), the Company took revenge sacking Byzantine territory, and they conquered the duchies of Athens and Neopatras in the name of the King of Aragon. Catalan rule over Greek lands lasted until 1390.

This territorial expansion was accompanied by a great development of the Catalan trade, centered in Barcelona, creating an extensive trade network across the Mediterranean which competed with those of the maritime republics of Genoa and Venice. In this line, institutions were created that would give legal protection to merchants, such as the Consulate of the Sea and the Book of the Consulate of the Sea, one of the first compilations of maritime law.

The second quarter of the 14th century saw crucial changes for Catalonia, marked by a succession of natural catastrophes, demographic crises, stagnation and decline in the Catalan economy, and the rise of social tensions. The year 1333 was known as Lo mal any primer (Catalan: "The first bad year") due to poor wheat harvest. The domains of the Aragonese Crown were affected severely by the Black Death pandemic and by later outbreaks of the plague. Between 1347 and 1497 Catalonia lost 37 percent of its population.

In 1410, King Martin I, the last reigning monarch of the House of Barcelona, died without surviving descendants. Under the Compromise of Caspe (1412), Ferdinand from the Castilian House of Trastámara received the Crown of Aragon as Ferdinand I of Aragon. Ferdinand's successor, Alfonso V ("the Magnanimous"), promoted a new stage of Catalan-Aragonese expansion, this time over the Kingdom of Naples, over which he eventually gained rule in 1443. However, he aggravated the social crisis in the Principality of Catalonia, both in the countryside and in the cities. Political conflict in Barcelona arose due to the disputes over the control of the Consell de Cent between two political factions, Biga and Busca looking for a solution to the economic crisis. Meanwhile, the "remença" (serfs') peasants subjected to the feudal abuses known as Evil customs began to organize themselves as a syndicate against seignorial pressures, serching protection from the monarch. Alfonso's brother, John II ("the Unreliable"), was an exceptionally deeply hated and opposed regent and ruler - both in the Basque kingdom of Navarre and in Catalonia.

The opposition of the institutions of Catalonia to the policies of John II resulted in their support to the son of John, Charles, Prince of Viana over his denied dynastic rights. In response of the detention of Charles by his father, the Generalitat established a political body, the Council of the Principality, whith whom, under menace of a conflict, John was forced to negotiate. The Capitulation of Vilafranca (1461) forced to release Charles from prison and appoint him lieutenant of Catalonia, while the king would need permission of the Generalitat to enter the Principality. The content of the Capitulation represented a culmination and consolidation of pactism and the constitutional system of Catalonia. However, the disaggrement of King John, the death of Charles shortly after and the Remença Uprising in 1462 led to the ten-year Catalan Civil War (1462-1472) that left the country exhausted. In 1472, the last separate ruler of Catalonia, the king René of Anjou ("the Good"), lost the war against King John.

John's son, Ferdinand II ("the Catholic"), recovered without war the northern Catalan counties (1493), which it had occupied during the conflict, and profoundly reformed Catalan institutions. The Constitució de l'Observança (1481) was approved, establishing the submission of royal power to the laws approved in the Catalan Courts. After decades of conflict, the peasants of remença were liberated from most of feudal abuses by the Sentencia Arbitral de Guadalupe (1486), in exchange for a payment.

Catalonia during the early modern period

The marriage of Isabella I of Castile and Ferdinand II of Aragon (1469) unified two of the three major Christian kingdoms in the Iberian peninsula, while the Kingdom of Navarre was incorporated later following Ferdinand II's 1512 invasion of the Basque kingdom.

This resulted in the reinforcement of the concept of Spain, which was already present in the mind of these kings, made up by the former Crown of Aragon, Castile, and a Navarre annexed to Castile (1515). In 1492, the last remaining portion of Al-Andalus around Granada was conquered and the Spanish conquest of the Americas began. Political power began to shift away from Aragon toward Castile and, subsequently, from Castile to the Spanish Empire, which engaged in frequent warfare in Europe striving for world domination. In 1516 Charles I of Spain became the first king to rule the Crowns of Castile and Aragon simultaneously by his own right. Following the death of his paternal (House of Habsburg) grandfather, Maximilian I, Holy Roman Emperor, he was also elected Charles V, Holy Roman Emperor, in 1519. The reign of Charles V was a relative harmonious period, during which Catalonia generally accepted the new structure of Spain, despite its own marginalization.

For an extended period, Catalonia, as part of the late Crown of Aragon, successfully retained its own institutional system and legislation against the trend observed in southern and central Europe throughout the early modern age, which eroded the importance of representative institutions, until they were finally suppressed as a result of the War of the Spanish Succession defeat at the beginning of the 18th century. The prolonged absence of the monarchs, who resided most of the time in Castile, led to the consolidation of the figure of the viceroy as the representative of the king in the Principality.

Over the next two centuries, Catalonia was generally on the losing side of a series of wars that led steadily to more centralization of power in Spain. Despite this fact, between the 16th and 18th centuries, the role of the political community in local affairs and the general government of the country was increased, while the royal powers remained relatively restricted, specially after the two last Courts (1701–1702 and 1705–1706). Tensions between the constitutional Catalan institutions and the gradually more centralized Monarchy began to arise. In 1626 the Count-Duke of Olivares, minister of Philip IV, tried to establish the military contribution of the states of the Monarchy, the Unión de Armas (Union of Arms), but the resistance of Catalonia to the project was strong. This events, alongside other factors such as the economic crisis, the presence of soldiers and the peasants' revolts led to the Reapers' War, also called Catalan Revolt (1640–1652), in the context of the Franco-Spanish War, in which Catalonia, led by the president of the Generalitat, Pau Claris, briefly declared itself as an independent republic under French protection in January 1641, and later joined the Monarchy of France, appointing king Louis XIII as count of Barcelona, but, after the first military successes the Catalans were finally defeated and reincorporated into the Crown of Spain in 1652.

In 1659, after the Treaty of the Pyrenees signed by Philip IV of Spain, the comarques (counties) of Roussillon, Conflent, Vallespir and part of la Cerdanya, now known as French Cerdagne, were ceded to France. The town of Llívia remained part of Spain, however, an isolated enclave a mile north of the new border. Catalan institutions were suppressed in this part of the territory and, in 1700, public use of Catalan language was prohibited. In recent times, this ceded area has come to be known by nationalist political parties in Catalonia as Northern Catalonia (Roussillon in French), part of the Catalan-spoken territories known as Catalan Countries. Currently, this region is administratively part of French Départment of Pyrénées-Orientales.

In the last decades of the 17th century during the reign of Spain's last Habsburg king, Charles II, despite intermittent conflict between Spain and France and new internal conflicts like the Revolt of the Barretines (1687-1689), the population increased to approximately 500.000 inhabitants and the Catalan economy recovered. This economic growth was boosted by the export of wine to England and the Dutch Republic, as due to the trade war of French minister Jean-Baptiste Colbert against the Dutch and later to the participation of these countries in the Nine Years' War against France were not able to trade with the French. This new situation caused many Catalans to look to England and, especially, the Netherlands as political and economic models for Catalonia.

At the dawn of the War of the Spanish Succession, the Bourbon Duke of Anjou claimed the throne of Spain as Philip V, and the Principality initially supported his claim. However, repressive mesures of the viceroy Francisco de Velasco and authoritarian decisions of the king (some of them contrary to Catalan legislation), as well the economic policy and distrust to the French absolutism provoked that Catalonia to change sides in 1705, when Habsburg candidate, the Archduke Charles of Austria (as Charles III of Spain) landed in Barcelona. Previously, the same year, the Principality of Catalonia and the Kingdom of England signed the Pact of Genoa, receiving the first one protection to its institutions and liberties, entering in the pro-Habsburg Grand Alliance. The Treaty of Utrecht (1713) put end to the war, and the allied armies withdrew from Catalonia which, nonetheless, remained fighting with its own army by decision of the States-General until the fall of Barcelona after a long siege on 11 September 1714. The victorious army of Philip V occupied the capital of Catalonia and (as happened to the kingdoms of Aragon and Valencia, also loyals to Charles) in 1716 the king enacted the Nueva Planta decrees. The decrees abolished the main Catalan institutions and laws (except the civil and mercantile laws), establishing absolutism as the new political system, and imposed the administrative use of Spanish language, progressively displacing Catalan.

After Nueva Planta

Apart from the abolition of the Catalan institutions, the Nueva Planta decrees ensured the imposition of the new absolutist system by reforming the Royal Audience of Catalonia, making it the highest governmental body of the Principality, absorbing many of the functions of the abolished institutions and becoming the instrument with which the Captain General of Catalonia, the supreme authority of the province (replacing the viceroy), appointed by the king, would govern. The division in vegueries was replaced with Castilian corregimientos. So late as in the 18th and 19th centuries, despite the military occupation, the imposition of high new taxes and the political economy of the House of Bourbon, the Catalonia under Spanish administration (now as a province) continued the process of proto-industrialization, relatively helped at the end of the century from the beginning of open commerce to America and protectionist policies enacted by the Spanish government (although the policy of Spanish government during those times changed many times between free trade and protectionism), consolidating the new economic growth model that was taking place in Catalonia since the end of the 17th century, becoming a center of Spain's industrialization; to this day, it remains one of the more industrialized parts of Spain, along with Madrid and the Basque Country. In 1833, by decree of minister Javier de Burgos, all of Spain was organized into provinces, included Catalonia, which was divided in four provinces without a common administration: Barcelona, Girona, Lleida and Tarragona.

On several occasions during the first third of the 20th century, Catalonia gained and lost varying degrees of autonomy, recovering the administrative unity in 1914, when the four Catalan provinces were authorized to create a commonwealth (Catalan: Mancomunitat) and, after the proclamation of the Second Spanish Republic in 1931, the Generalitat was restored as an institution of self-government, but as in most regions of Spain, Catalan autonomy and culture were crushed to an unprecedented degree after the defeat of the Second Spanish Republic in the Spanish Civil War (1936–1939) which brought Francisco Franco to power. Public use of the Catalan language was again banned after a brief period of general recuperation.

The Franco era ended with Franco's death in 1975; in the subsequent Spanish transition to democracy, Catalonia recovered political and cultural autonomy. It became one of the autonomous communities of Spain. In comparison, Northern Catalonia in France has no autonomy.

The term Principality

The counts of Barcelona were commonly considered the princeps or primus inter pares ("the first among equals") by the other counts of the Spanish March, both because of their military and economic power, and the supremacy of Barcelona over other cities.

Thus, the Count of Barcelona, Ramon Berenguer I, is called "Prince of Barcelona, Count of Girona and Marchis of Ausona" (princeps Barchinonensis, comes Gerundensis, marchio Ausonensis) in the Act of Consecration of the Cathedral of Barcelona (1058). There are also several references to the Prince in different sections of the Usages of Barcelona, the collection of laws that ruled the county since the early 11th century. Usage #64 calls principatus the group of counties of Barcelona, Girona, and Ausona, all of them under the authority of the count of Barcelona.

The first reference to the term Principat de Cathalunya is found in the dispute between Peter IV of Aragon and III of Barcelona and the Kingdom of Mallorca in 1343, and it was used again in the convocation of the Catalan Courts in Perpignan in 1350, presided by Peter IV. It was intended to indicate that the territory under the laws produced by those Courts was not a kingdom, but the enlargement of the territory under the authority of the Count of Barcelona, who was also the king of Aragon, as seen in the "Actas de las cortes generales de la Corona de Aragón 1362–1363". However, there is an older reference, in a more informal context, in Bernat Desclot's chronicles, dating from the second half of the 13th century.

As the Count of Barcelona and the Courts added more counties under his jurisdiction, such as the County of Urgell, the name of Catalonia, which comprised several counties of different names including the County of Barcelona, was used for the whole. The terms Catalonia and Catalans were commonly used to refer to the territory in Northeastern Spain and western Mediterranean France, as well as its inhabitants, and not just the County of Barcelona, at least since the beginnings of the 12th century, as shown in the earliest recordings of these names in the Liber Maiolichinus (around 1117–1125).

The name "Principality of Catalonia" is abundant in historical documentation that refers to Catalonia between the mid-14th century and early 19th century. According to research carried out in recent decades, is considered to be in the second half of the 12th century when the Catalan counties form a unified and cohesive political entity, -although jurisdictionally divided- called "Catalonia". This happens because the counts of Barcelona became the one hand, the majority of sovereigns Catalan Counties and the other hand kings of Aragon, which helped them prevail in the rest of autonomous Catalan counts (Pallars, Urgell and Empúries) if they were not in their feudal vassals, while also incorporated its extensive domain the Islamic territories of Tortosa and Lleida. The political entity resulting from this process since the 13th century, was repeatedly mentioned the term "kingdom" as a medieval state, i.e. public domain political regime monarchist government.

However, it consolidated this denomination officially, because, for various historical reasons, the rulers of the Kingdom of Aragon never use the title "King of Catalonia". This is where comes in the use of the term "principality", since at least since the 12th century, the word was synonymous total term "kingdom" which alluded generically political entities which categorize historiographically the expression "Medieval States". Yet it was not until the 14th century -specifically, since 1350- that, greetings to work of Peter III of Aragon, the Principality of Catalonia became an official and popular name. This political entity was part of some composite monarchies or dynastic conglomerates as the Crown of Aragon, the Spanish Monarchy and the Kingdom of France (1641–1652), being on an equal footing with other political communities of the time, or external in relation to such great empires, as were the kingdoms of Castile, Aragon, Valencia, England, Scotland or the Duchy of Milan, for example.

Following the Nueva Planta decrees of 1716 at the end of the War of the Spanish Succession (1701–1714) and the subsequent dismantling of Catalan institutional system, the territory being annexed to Castile became a province of the new and more unified Kingdom of Bourbon Spain, but "principality" continued to be the definition of the territory, as witness the Nueva Planta decrees created the Royal Audience of the Principality of Catalonia in 1716. This situation remained until the Kingdom of Spain was transformed permanently, despite several Carlist Wars, into a liberal state in 1833, when Secretary Javier de Burgos eliminated the province of the Principality of Catalonia, dividing the territory in four provinces that still exist. Thus, the term disappeared from the administrative and political reality of the country. In 1931, Republican movements favoured its abandonment because it is historically related to the monarchy.

Neither the Statute of Autonomy of Catalonia, Spanish Constitution nor French Constitution, mention this denomination, but, despite most of them being republican, it is moderately popular among Catalan nationalists and independentists.

Government and law
The political system of the Principality of Catalonia and the other realms of the Crown of Aragon has been defined by historiography as "pactism". It designate the explicit or tacit pact between king and kingdom (in its organic and estamental representation), which decisively limited the royal power.

Institutions

Cort General de Catalunya or Corts Catalanes (General Court of Catalonia or Catalan Courts): parliamentary body and main institution of the Principality, established during the 13th century. Summoned and presided by the monarch, it was composed by representatives the three estates of the realm (braços) and passed the legislation and the economic donation to the Crown. Also served as monarch's council and as the place where the king could administer justice.
Diputació del General or Generalitat de Catalunya (Deputation of the General or Generalitat of Catalonia): permanent council of deputies, established in 1359 by the Courts in order to collect the "taxes of the General", and later gained political power and tasks of prosecutor, becoming the most relevant Catalan institution during the early modern age. It consisted of three deputies and three oïdors (auditors of accounts), there was one deputy and one oïdor by estate.
Consell de Cent de Barcelona (Council of One Hundred of Barcelona): institution of government of the city of Barcelona, created during the reign of James I. The municipal authority rested on five, later six, counselors (led by the Conseller en cap, Head Counselor) elected by a Council of hundred individuals (jurats).
Reial Audiència i Reial Consell de Catalunya (Royal Audience and Royal Council of Catalonia): supreme court of justice of Catalonia and seat of the government, established in 1493. Its members were elected by the king, and it was presided by the Chancellor (Canceller) during the absence of the king and the viceroy.
Conferència dels Tres Comuns (Conference of the Three Commons): joint meeting of the most dynamic and powerful institutions of the Catalan constitutional system during the 17th and 18th centuries, the Generalitat, the Military Estate and the Council of One Hundred of Barcelona, in order to discuss and solve the political issues of the Principality.
Junta de Braços or Braços Generals (lit. "Council of Arms", States-General): extraordinary parliamentary council convened by the Generalitat, composed by the representatives of the Catalan Courts who at that time were in Barcelona. The Junta operated like the Courts, but formally lacking legislative powers.
Tribunal de Contrafaccions (Court of Contraventions): court of justice established by the Courts of 1701–1702 in order to ensure the application of the constitutions, as well as solving and prosecuting any actions contrary to the Catalan legislation, including the ones performed by the king or his officers. Its members were elected in parity by the institutions of the land and the king. It represented an important advance in the guarantee of individual and civil rights, even at the European context.

Legislation
Usatges de Barcelona (Usages of Barcelona): compilation of customs and legislation based on the Roman and Visigothic law of the County of Barcelona, applied in practice to the entire Principality, that form the basis for the Catalan constitutions.
Constitucions de Catalunya (Catalan constitutions): laws promulgated by the king and approved by the Catalan Courts. They had pre-eminence over the other legal rules and could only be revoked by the Courts themselves.
Capítols de Cort (Chapters of Court): laws promulgated by the Courts and approved by the king.
Actes de Cort (Acts of Court): minor legislative and other rules and decrees promulgated by the Courts, which didn't need the formal approval of the king.

Royal Officers
Lloctinent or Virrei de Catalunya (Lieutenant or Viceroy of Catalonia): representative of the king in the Principality from the 15th to the 18th centuries. As the alter nos of the monarch, he received the same treatment and honours. Catalan constitutions allowed to appoint non-Catalans as viceroys.
Portantveus de General Governador: highest official of the ordinary royal administration. The main responsibilities comprised the administration of justice throughout the territory. Legally, when the king died, he assumed the royal faculties and replaced the viceroy, an event known as vice regia, until the new king swore the constitutions.
Batlle General de Catalunya
Mestre Racional: royal official who was in charge of the accounting of the Principality. There were one Mestre in every realm of the Crown of Aragon. He recorded the accounts indicating the expenses and income of the royal patrimony. The Mestre Racional of the Principality of Catalonia also had jurisdiction over the kingdoms of Majorca and Sardinia.

Vegueries

The vegueria was a territorial organization of Catalonia headed by a veguer. The origins of the vegueria go back to the era of the Carolingian Empire, when vicars (Latin: , singular ) were installed beneath the counts in the Marca Hispanica. The office of a vicar was a vicariate and his territory was a vicaria. All these Latin terms of Carolingian administration evolved in the Catalan language.

The veguer was appointed by the king and was accountable to him. He was the military commander of his vegueria (and thus keeper of the publicly owned castles), the chief justice of the same district, and the man in charge of the public finances (the fisc) of the region entrusted to him. As time wore on, the functions of the veguer became more and more judicial in nature. He held a cort (court) del veguer or de la vegueria with its own seal. The cort had authority in all matter save those relating to the feudal aristocracy. It commonly heard pleas of the crown, civil, and criminal cases. The veguer did, however, retain some military functions as well: he was the commander of the militia and the superintendent of royal castles. His job was law and order and the maintenance of the king's peace: in many respects an office analogous to that of the sheriff in England.

Some of the larger vegueries included one or more sotsvegueries (subvigueries), which had a large degree of autonomy. At the end of the 12th century in Catalonia, there were 12 vegueries. By the end of the reign of Peter the Great (1285) there were 17, and by the time of James the Just, there were 21. After the French annexion of the vegueries of Perpignan and Vilafranca de Conflent in 1659, Catalonia retained a division of 15 vegueries, 9 sotsvegueries and the special district of the Val d'Aran. These administrative divisions remained until 1716 when they were replaced by the Castilian corregimientos.

Military

The Usage Princeps namque, dating from the 11th century, regulated the defense of the prince and the Principality, and became the basis of the organization of self-defense and paramilitary units throughout Catalan history, materialized in mutual-protection agreements known as Sagramental, while the militia corps was known as Sometent. The feudal system allowed to lordships, institutions and corporations to raise its own armies, as well as to be convened by the king due to feudal agreements, alongside to the vassals and subjects of the other realms, however, there was no standing army. Catalan soldiers played an important role in the expansion of the Crown to Valencia, Majorca and the Mediterranean. Catalan Galleys contributed to expand and secure the hegemony along the sea, while the army invested much of its resources in the conquest of Sardinia and in the War of the Sicilian Vespers. After the last one, most of the Almogavers (light infantry) became mercenaries of the Great Catalan Company created by Roger de Flor in 1303.

Due to the outbreak of the Catalan Civil War (1462–1472), the Council of the Principality of Catalonia organised different military forces to fight against the king John II. The Civil War saw one of the first generalised use of firearms in a military conflict of Western Europe. In the Catalan Courts of 1493, king Ferdinand II confirmed the Usage Princeps namque.

After the establishment of the Monarchy of Spain in the 16th century, Catalans were found in Habsburg military, however, the Usage Princeps namque and the lack of a large Catalan manpower limited their presence in comparison to the other polities of the Empire. Some cities like Barcelona gained recognition of self-defense and established urban militias, known as the Coronela. While the military conflicts with France aroused, many Catalan militias took part in the fight, as happened in the siege of Salses, in 1639, alongside the regular army.

Symbols
As state under royal sovereignty, Catalonia, like the other political entities of the period, didn't have an own flag or coat of arms in the modern sense. However, a variety of royal and other symbols were used in order to identify the Principality and its institutions.

Language

Catalonia constitutes the original nucleus where Catalan is spoken.
The Catalan language shares common traits with the Romance languages of Iberia and Gallo-Romance languages of southern France, it is regarded by a minority of linguists as being an Ibero-Romance language (the group that includes Spanish), and by a majority as a Gallo-Romance language, such as French or Occitan from which Catalan diverged between 11th and 14th centuries.

By the 9th century, Catalan had evolved from Vulgar Latin on both sides of the eastern end of the Pyrenees. From the 8th century, the Catalan counts extended their territory southwards and westwards, conquering territories then occupied by Muslims, bringing their language with them. In the 11th century, feudal documents written in macaronic Latin begin to show Catalan elements. By the end of the 11th century, documents written completely or mostly in Catalan begin to appear, like the Complaints of Guitard Isarn, Lord of Caboet (ca. 1080–1095), or The Oath of peace and truce of count Pere Ramon (1098).

Catalan lived a golden age during the Late Middle Ages, reaching a peak of maturity and cultural plenitude, and expanded territorially as more lands were added to the dominions of the Crown of Aragon. Examples of this can be seen in the works of Majorcan Ramon Llull (1232–1315), The Four Great Catalan Chronicles (13th-14th centuries), and the Valencian school of poetry which culminated in Ausiàs March (1397–1459). Catalan became the language of the Kingdom of Majorca, as well the main language of the Kingdom of Valencia, particularly in coastal areas. It was also extended to Sardinia and it was used as an administrative language in Sardinia, Sicily and Athens. Between the 13th and 15th centuries this language was present all over the Mediterranean world, and it was one of the first basis of the Lingua Franca

The belief that political splendor was correlated with linguistic consolidation was voiced through the Royal Chancery, which promoted a highly standardized language. By the 15th century, the city of Valencia had become the center of social and cultural dynamism. The novel of chivalry Tirant lo Blanc (1490), by Joanot Martorell, shows the transition from medieval to Renaissance values, something than can also be seen in the works of Bernat Metge and Andreu Febrer. During this period, Catalan remained as one of the 'great languages' of medieval Europe. The first book produced with movable type in the Iberian Peninsula was printed in Catalan.

With the union of the crowns of Castille and Aragon (1479), the use of Castilian (Spanish) gradually became more prestigious and marked the start of the relative decline of the Catalan. Along the 16th and 17th centuries, Catalan literature came under the influence of Spanish, and the urban and literary classes became largely bilingual. After the defeat of the pro-Habsburg coalition in the War of Spanish Succession (1714) Spanish replaced Catalan in legal documentation, becoming the administrative and political language in the Principality of Catalonia and the kingdoms of Valencia and Majorca.

Today, Catalan is one of the three official languages of autonomous community of Catalonia, as stated in the Catalan Statute of Autonomy; the other two are Spanish, and Occitan in its Aranese variety. Catalan has no official recognition in "Northern Catalonia". Catalan has official status alongside Spanish in the Balearic Islands and in the Land of Valencia (where it is called Valencian), as well as Algherese Catalan alongside Italian in the city of Alghero and in Andorra as the sole official language.

Culture
Traditions of Catalonia
Catalan art
Religion in Catalonia
Cuisine of Catalonia
:Category:Catalan culture

See also
List of Counts of Barcelona
List of presidents of the Generalitat de Catalunya
List of viceroys of Catalonia
Royal Archives of Barcelona
Palau Reial Major
Catalan Countries
List of Catalans
Catalan nationalism

References

Bibliography

de Tejada y Spínola, Francisco Elías (1950). Las doctrinas políticas en la Cataluña Medieval. Barcelona: Ayma ed.
Vilar, Pierre (1962). La Catalogne dans l'Espagne moderne. Recherches sur les fondements économiques des structures nationales. III vols., Paris

Serra, Eva (1966). La guerra dels segadors. Barcelona: Ed. Bruguera

Bonnassie, Pierre (1975-1976). La Catalogne du milieu du Xe à la fin du XIe siècle. Croissance et mutations d'une société. Toulouse: Publications de l'Université de Toulouse-Le Mirail.

Bisson, Thomas Noël (1998). Tormented voices. Power, crisis and humanity in rural Catalonia 1140–1200. Harvard University Press
Cingolani, Stefano Maria (2006). Seguir les Vestígies dels Antecessors. Llinatge, Reialesa i Historiografia a Catalunya des de Ramon Berenguer IV a Pere II (1131-1285). Anuario de Estudios Medievales. ISSN 0066-5061

Torres i Sans, Xavier (2008). Naciones sin nacionalismo. Cataluña en la monarquía hispánica. Valencia: Publicacions de la Universitat de València 

Capdeferro, Josep and Serra, Eva (2014). La defensa de les constitucions de Catalunya: el Tribunal de Contrafaccions (1702-1713). Generalitat de Catalunya. Departament de Justícia

External links

Catalonia in Hiperenciclopedia
General Archive of the Crown of Aragon
Revistes Catalanes amb Accés Obert
History of the Generalitat of Catalonia

 
History of Catalonia
Crown of Aragon
Former countries on the Iberian Peninsula
Medieval Catalonia
Early Modern Catalonia
Medieval Spain
Spanish Renaissance
Early Modern history of Spain
Catalonia, Principality of
States and territories established in the 1160s
States and territories disestablished in 1714
1160s establishments in Europe
1714 disestablishments in Spain
12th-century establishments in Aragon
Catalonia